Roman Harper (born December 11, 1982) is a former American football safety. He played college football at Alabama, and was drafted by the Saints in the second round of the 2006 NFL Draft. In 2009, Harper earned his first Pro Bowl invitation (first team) and helped lead the Saints to Super Bowl XLIV.  The following year, 2010, he was again selected as a first team All-Pro.  In 2015, he helped lead the Carolina Panthers to Super Bowl 50.

Early life
Harper went to high school in Prattville, Alabama, where he was an outstanding safety and returner for Prattville High School. He played Quarterback his senior season and led the Lions to a 9-1 regular season finish. Harper was a first Team All State performer and was also selected to the Alabama-Mississippi.

College career
Harper attended the University of Alabama, and played for the Alabama Crimson Tide football team. He was a four-year letterman and a three-year starter and finished his college football career with 302 tackles, 5 interceptions, 5 forced fumbles, 4 fumble recoveries, and 3.5 sacks. As a sophomore, he totaled 114 tackles (second most on the team) and also had an interception and a fumble recovery.  As a junior, he was a second team All-Southeastern Conference selection.  As a senior, he was a first team All-Southeastern Conference selection.

Professional career

New Orleans Saints
The New Orleans Saints selected Harper in the second round (43rd overall) of the 2006 NFL Draft. Harper was the sixth safety drafted in 2006.

On July 27, 2006, the New Orleans Saints signed Harper to a four-year, $3.55 million contract that included a signing bonus of $880,000. Throughout training camp, Harper competed to be the starting strong safety against veteran Omar Stoutmire. Head coach Sean Payton named Harper and Josh Bullocks the starting safety duo to begin the regular season.

Harper started five games in 2006 but was put on injured reserve on October 10. He started 16 games in 2007 and 15 games in 2008. In 2009, Harper earned his first Pro Bowl berth and helped lead the Saints to their first Super Bowl win in franchise history. In Super Bowl XLIV, he led the Saints with 8 tackles and defeated the Indianapolis Colts 31-17.

Harper was released by the Saints on February 12, 2014 after eight years with the team.

Carolina Panthers
On March 15, 2014, Harper was signed by the Carolina Panthers. During his debut performance for the Panthers against the Tampa Bay Buccaneers, Harper recorded 2 tackles, 1 pass deflection, and 1 interception. During the Panthers week 5 win over the Chicago Bears, Harper recorded his second interception of the season against Jay Cutler. Harper won NFC defensive player of the week for his performance in week 17 against division rival Atlanta Falcons. Harper recorded 6 tackles, 1 pass defended, and a 31-yard pick six. In Harper's second season with the team, The Panthers finished the season with a team record 15 wins. They went on to defeat the Seahawks and Cardinals in their first two playoff games. On February 7, 2016, Harper was part of the Panthers team that played in Super Bowl 50. In the game, he had two tackles, but the Panthers fell to the Denver Broncos by a score of 24–10.

New Orleans Saints (second stint)
On June 7, 2016, Harper agreed to return to the Saints, where he was expected to play a role in the leadership of the defense while serving as a backup to the Saints' younger safeties. He signed a one-year, $1.065 million contract with the Saints.

Awards and championships
2009 - Super Bowl XLIV Champion
2009 - Named to first NFL Pro Bowl
2007 - Ed Block Courage Award

NFL statistics

Key
 GP: games played
 COMB: combined tackles
 TOTAL: total tackles
 AST: assisted tackles
 SACK: sacks
 FF: forced fumbles
 FR: fumble recoveries
 FR YDS: fumble return yards 
 INT: interceptions
 IR YDS: interception return yards
 AVG IR: average interception return
 LNG: longest interception return
 TD: interceptions returned for touchdown
 PD: passes defensed

Community work
Harper and his mother, Princess Harper, founded the Harper's Hope Foundation in 2009. The primary goal of the foundation has been, “to strengthen families and enhance their emotional, social, and spiritual health through educational programs, enrichment activities, and economic development.”

In July 2010, the foundation hosted its first annual "A Sainted Weekend" Celebrity Golf Tournament and Silent Auction.

Harper became a member of School of the Legends (SOTL) in 2010.

References

External links

Carolina Panthers bio
New Orleans Saints bio

1982 births
Living people
People from Prattville, Alabama
Players of American football from Alabama
Alabama Crimson Tide football players
American football safeties
National Conference Pro Bowl players
New Orleans Saints players
Carolina Panthers players
Ed Block Courage Award recipients